Pavel Valerievich Datsyuk (born 20 July 1978) is a Russian former professional ice hockey player. Datsyuk was nicknamed the "Magic Man" honoring his incredible stickhandling and creativity with the puck. From 2001 to 2016, he played for the Detroit Red Wings of the National Hockey League (NHL). In 2017, Datsyuk was named one of the "100 Greatest NHL Players" in history, and was the only active player outside of the NHL at the time of announcement.

Datsyuk won the Stanley Cup in 2002 and 2008 with the Red Wings, and the Gagarin Cup in 2017 with SKA Saint Petersburg. He was part of the Russia men's national ice hockey team at the Olympic Games in 2002, 2006, 2010 and was team captain in 2014 and 2018. With his gold medal win at the 2018 Olympics, Datsyuk joined the Triple Gold Club.

Datsyuk won the Frank J. Selke Trophy as the NHL's top defensive forward in the 2007–08, 2008–09 and 2009–10 NHL season. He also won four consecutive Lady Byng Memorial Trophies, from 2006 to 2009, awarded for performance and sportsmanship. He was nominated for the Hart Memorial Trophy as the NHL's most valuable player following the 2008–09 season. Datsyuk is well known for his elite defensive play and game-changing offensive skills.

Early years
Datsyuk was born in Sverdlovsk of the then-Soviet Union. His parents have called him by his short name "Pasha" from an early age. His childhood had more than its fair share of difficulties, especially at the age of 16, when his mother died.
While Datsyuk displayed above-average hockey skills, he was often overlooked by scouts because of his smaller size. He began playing for the farm club of Dynamo Yekaterinburg in the mid-1990s, though he seemed headed for an undistinguished career until noted Olympic trainer Vladimir Krikunov began coaching the team.

The boy "with the twitchy walk" caught the eye of Krikunov, but not on the ice. Instead, Datsyuk excelled on the soccer field, where his anticipation, vision and intelligence were more apparent. Under Krikunov, Datsyuk evolved into a particularly efficient two-way player, and he began to draw wider attention among Russian hockey fans. Despite his early successes, however, he went undrafted in the 1996 and 1997 NHL drafts.

Playing career

Early play in Russia
Datsyuk was first noticed by Detroit Red Wings Director of European Scouting Håkan Andersson in the summer of 1997–98. Andersson was in Moscow to scout defenseman Dmitri Kalinin, but the one who caught his eye was Datsyuk, described as "this little guy on the other team." Andersson made another trip to see Datsyuk and would have gone a third time, though his flight was canceled due to a storm. A scout from the Calgary Flames was scheduled to fly on the plane as well, and as a result of the storm Andersson believes he was the only NHL scout to have seen Datsyuk play prior to the 1998 NHL Entry Draft, when the Red Wings drafted him 171st overall.

Detroit Red Wings

2001–2005: Early years
When Datsyuk began his NHL career for the Red Wings, he was mentored by Soviet stars Igor Larionov and Sergei Fedorov, as well as Detroit captain Steve Yzerman. He was put on a line with Brett Hull and Boyd Devereaux and had a moderately productive first year. The length and difficulty of the NHL season forced him to sit out a number of games at the end of the year in preparation for the Stanley Cup playoffs. He contributed three goals and three assists to the Red Wings' 2002 Stanley Cup run.

Expectations were high for Datsyuk's second season, particularly with the addition of another highly touted prospect to the team, Henrik Zetterberg. Zetterberg replaced Boyd Devereaux on the Datsyuk–Hull line, and the famous version of the "Two Kids and an Old Goat Line" was born. He played only 64 games due to a knee injury but ended up with 51 points for the season. His playoff performance was disappointing, however, the same as the entire Red Wings team; Detroit was swept by the Mighty Ducks of Anaheim in the first round, and Datsyuk was held pointless.

The departure of Sergei Fedorov in the 2003 off-season made room for Datsyuk to rise to prominence on the Red Wings. He took full advantage of his elevated ice time, where his playmaking skills earned him a spot in the 2004 NHL All-Star Game. In the 2004 playoffs, he had no goals and six assists through 12 games before Detroit was eliminated in the second round by the Calgary Flames.

Datsyuk became a restricted free agent during the 2004–05 off-season but could not reach a deal with the Red Wings despite repeated statements by his agent, Gary Greenstin, indicating his desire to stay in Detroit. He chose not to take the salary dispute to arbitration, and instead played with Dynamo Moscow during the 2004–05 NHL lockout. On 4 September 2005, Datsyuk then signed a one-year contract with Avangard Omsk of the Russian Superleague (RSL), where Dynamo Moscow matched the offer two days later, retaining the player.

On 19 September 2005, the day the arbitration committee of the RSL was set to determine which club had Datsyuk's rights, Datsyuk agreed to a two-year deal with the Red Wings for a total of US$7.8 million.

2005–2010: Ascent to stardom
During the 2005–06 season, Datsyuk's high level of play, combined with his sportsmanship (just 22 penalty minutes for the entire season), won him the Lady Byng Trophy, the first of four consecutive awards. Datsyuk also earned a spot on the Russian national team for the 2006 Winter Olympics in Turin, Italy.

During the 2006–07 season, Datsyuk debuted Reebok's new hockey stick, with holes bored into the shaft to make it more aerodynamic, dubbed the 9KO. He completed the season matching his previous campaign's total of 87 points. Prior to the beginning of the playoffs, on 6 April 2007, Datsyuk signed a seven-year, US$46.9 million contract extension with the Red Wings. He then helped Detroit advance to the Western Conference Finals against the eventual Stanley Cup champions, the Anaheim Ducks, contributing 16 points in 18 games.

In 2007–08, Datsyuk was voted by NHL fans, along with teammates Nicklas Lidström and Henrik Zetterberg, to start for the Western Conference in the 2008 All-Star Game at Philips Arena in Atlanta. He went on to have a career year, scoring a team-high 97 points in 82 games while also leading all Red Wings forwards in blocked shots. In leading the team in scoring, he joined Ted Lindsay, Gordie Howe and Steve Yzerman as the only players in franchise history to do so in three consecutive seasons. Entering into the playoffs, Datsyuk scored his first career NHL hat-trick on 12 May 2008, in a 5–2 win over the Dallas Stars in Game 3 of the Western Conference Finals, en route to a meeting in the Finals with the Pittsburgh Penguins. In Game 6 of the series, Datsyuk recorded two assists in a 3–2 win to clinch the team's 11th Stanley Cup title and its fourth in 11 years.

Having led the NHL in 2007–08 with a plus-minus of +41 and 144 takeaways (58 more than Mike Modano's second-best total of 86), Datsyuk was awarded the Frank J. Selke Trophy as the League' best defensive forward. With just 20 penalty minutes, he also won the Lady Byng Trophy. In voting for the Selke, Datsyuk received 537 points (43 first place votes) while John Madden of the New Jersey Devils received 447 points and Datsyuk's linemate Henrik Zetterberg received 425 points. In voting for the Lady Byng, Datsyuk received 985 points (75 first place votes). In addition, Datsyuk became the first NHL player to win the Lady Byng three consecutive times in over 70 years, since Frank Boucher of the New York Rangers won from 1933 to 1935. Datsyuk and Ron Francis are the only players to have been awarded both the Selke and Lady Byng trophies during their careers.

Datsyuk was selected to his third NHL All-Star Game in 2009, but due to a hip injury, he did not participate. However, as per a newly formed League policy stating players must demonstrate injury by missing at least one game prior to the All-Star Game, Datsyuk was suspended one game, along with teammate Nicklas Lidström, for not attending.

Datsyuk finished the 2008–09 season with 97 points (32 goals and 65 assists), matching his career high. He also won the Frank J. Selke Trophy, beating out the Philadelphia Flyers' Mike Richards and the Vancouver Canucks' Ryan Kesler, and won the Lady Byng for the fourth consecutive season. Datsyuk also received a nomination for the Best NHL Player Award at the ESPYs, but lost to the Pittsburgh Penguins' Sidney Crosby.

Datsyuk finished with his lowest end-of-season point total since the lockout in the 2009–10 season, scoring 70 points in 82 games. As a result of early season injuries to sniper Johan Franzén, center Valtteri Filppula and defenceman Niklas Kronwall, the Red Wings struggled to find consistency. However, a strong finish escalated the team from ninth place in the Western Conference in February to fifth place, and another 100-point season. Datsyuk scored the first two goals in Game 7 of the first round against the Phoenix Coyotes, including a breakaway deke on Ilya Bryzgalov, that sent the Wings to the second round for the fourth consecutive playoff season. The Red Wings, however, lost in five games to the San Jose Sharks.

2010–2016: Final years in Detroit

Datsyuk achieved a Gordie Howe hat trick on the opening night of the 2010–11 season against the Anaheim Ducks with a goal, an assist and a fight, which came against Corey Perry. Datsyuk was yet again impressive in the 2011 playoffs, leading his team with 15 points in 11 games. As the Red Wings fell behind 3–0 to the San Jose Sharks in the second round (which also happened the previous year), Datsyuk almost led his team back from the deficit to win the series; a Game 5-winning assist to Tomas Holmström's goal, a Game 6-winning assist to Valtteri Filppula's goal and a Game 7 late backhand goal highlighted Datsyuk's heroics in an eventual losing effort.

During the entirety of the 2011 pre-season, Datsyuk wore jersey number 24 as a tribute to former teammate Ruslan Salei, who perished on 7 September 2011, in the Lokomotiv Yaroslavl plane crash, along with 43 others. Datsyuk was an early-season candidate for the Hart Memorial Trophy, awarded to the League MVP, until a knee injury in February forced the Red Wings into a slump. The team dropped from first place in February to fifth at the end of the season, where they drew the Nashville Predators in the first round, losing the series four games to one. Datsyuk finished the season with 67 points in 70 games for the regular season, and was also named to the 2012 NHL All-Star Game in Ottawa.

As the NHL entered its second lockout in eight years in 2012–13, Datsyuk followed other prominent NHL players, such as Alexander Ovechkin and Evgeni Malkin, in playing overseas; he signed with CSKA Moscow of the Kontinental Hockey League (KHL) in September. Datsyuk tallied 36 points in 31 games.

When play resumed in January 2013, Datsyuk returned to the Red Wings and managed to score 49 points in 47 games. Detroit would make it to the second round of the 2013 playoffs before being defeated by the eventual champions, the Chicago Blackhawks, in seven games via an overtime goal by Brent Seabrook. The Red Wings lost the series despite being ahead at one point three games to one. Later in the 2013 off-season, Datsyuk signed a three-year extension to stay with Detroit.

On 14 February 2016, Datsyuk became the sixth Red Wing player to reach the 900 point milestone, and the fifth Russian player to do so. Datsyuk was named the First Star of the Week for the week ending 15 February 2016. He shared the league lead with five goals and tied for second overall with seven points in four games to help lead the Red Wings to seven out of a possible eight standings points.

On 18 June 2016, Datsyuk announced that he was leaving Detroit to play in Russia, ending his 14-year career with the Red Wings. He left the Wings having won two Stanley Cups (2002 and 2008), four consecutive Lady Byng trophies (2006, 2007, 2008, and 2009), 953 games played, and 918 points. He was the last remaining member of the Wings' 2002 Stanley Cup Championship team.

On 24 June 2016, the Red Wings traded Datsyuk's contract to the Arizona Coyotes along with the 16th overall pick in the 2016 NHL Entry Draft, in exchange for the 20th overall pick, the 53rd overall pick, and Joe Vitale in order for the Red Wings to clear salary cap space.

Return to Russia

SKA Saint Petersburg: 2016–2019
On 8 July 2016, Datsyuk signed a two-year contract with powerhouse SKA Saint Petersburg of the KHL. During the 2016–17 season, Datsyuk recorded 12 goals and 22 assists in 44 regular season games, and helped lead SKA Saint Petersburg to the Gagarin Cup in his first season back in the KHL. During the 2017–18 season, Datsyuk recorded eight goals and 27 assists in 37 regular season games. On 17 April 2018, Datsyuk signed a one-year contract extension with SKA Saint Petersburg.

He was named "Male Athlete of the Year" in the nomination "Pride of Russia" by the Ministry of Sport of Russia, leaving behind runner Sergey Shubenkov and cross-country skier Alexander Bolshunov.

Avtomobilist Yekaterinburg: 2019–2021
Following completion of the 2018–19 season, his third with SKA, Datsyuk left the club as a free agent following the conclusion of his contract. On 5 June 2019, despite light speculation of a possible reunion with the Red Wings, Datsyuk opted to continue in the KHL, returning to play in his hometown with Avtomobilist Yekaterinburg on a one-year contract. On 10 July 2020, Datsyuk extended with Avtomobilist for another one-year contract. He retired in 2021.

Personal life
At the age of 18, Datsyuk met his future wife Svetlana in Sverdlovsk. They married three years later, and had a daughter named Elizabeth in 2004. They divorced in 2010. Datsyuk got married for a second time in 2012; his new wife is named Maria. On 23 April 2014, she gave birth to his second child, a daughter named Vasilisa. His third child, a son named Pavel Jr., was born in February 2017.

He is a Russian Orthodox Christian.

Career achievements

International

 Olympic gold medal – 2018
 World Championship gold medal – 2012
 World Championship best forward – 2010
 World Championship All-Star team – 2010
 Named captain of the Russia men's national ice hockey team for the 2014 Winter Olympics
 Named captain of the Olympic Athletes from Russia men's ice hockey team for the 2018 Winter Olympics
 Olympic All-Star team – 2018

NHL
2-time Stanley Cup champion – 2002, 2008
NHL Second All-Star team – 2009
Selected to the NHL All-Star Game – 2004, 2008, 2009*, 2012
Played in the NHL YoungStars Game – 2002
Lady Byng Memorial Trophy – 2006, 2007, 2008, 2009
Frank J. Selke Trophy – 2008, 2009, 2010
NHL Plus-Minus Award – 2008
NHL Offensive Player of the Month – December 2003
Carhartt "Hardest Working" Player of the Month – December 2007
2010–11 NHL Players Poll: Hardest to Take the Puck Off of; Cleanest Player.
2011–12 NHL Players Poll: Smartest Player; Most Difficult to Play Against; Hardest to Take the Puck From; Most Difficult to Stop; Cleanest Player; Toughest Forward to Play Against.
Kharlamov Trophy – 2011, 2013: Voted Best Russian NHL Player by Russian NHL Players
Selected as one of the 100 Greatest NHL Players (2017) 
* did not attend

KHL
Gagarin Cup champion – 2017
2-time KHL All-Star – 2013, 2017
Sergey Gimayev Prize (top veteran player) – 2021

Career statistics

Regular season and playoffs

International

References

External links
 Official Site
 
 Pavel Datsyuk in Russian Hockey Players Guide
 Pavel Datsyuk: Intellectual might of the Red Machine 

1978 births
Living people
Ak Bars Kazan players
Avtomobilist Yekaterinburg players
HC CSKA Moscow players
Detroit Red Wings draft picks
Detroit Red Wings players
HC Dynamo Moscow players
Frank Selke Trophy winners
Ice hockey players at the 2002 Winter Olympics
Ice hockey players at the 2006 Winter Olympics
Ice hockey players at the 2010 Winter Olympics
Ice hockey players at the 2014 Winter Olympics
Ice hockey players at the 2018 Winter Olympics
Lady Byng Memorial Trophy winners
Medalists at the 2002 Winter Olympics
Medalists at the 2018 Winter Olympics
National Hockey League All-Stars
Olympic bronze medalists for Russia
Olympic gold medalists for Olympic Athletes from Russia
Olympic ice hockey players of Russia
Olympic medalists in ice hockey
Russian expatriate ice hockey people
Russian expatriate sportspeople in the United States
Russian ice hockey centres
SKA Saint Petersburg players
Sportspeople from Yekaterinburg
Stanley Cup champions
Triple Gold Club
Russian people of Ukrainian descent
Expatriate ice hockey players in the United States